Kelly–Simoldes–UDO is a Portuguese cycling team based in Oliveira de Azeméis, that holds a UCI Continental team licence. The cycling team is affiliated with União Desportiva Oliveirense (UDO), the largest multisports club of Oliveira de Azeméis.

History
Manuel Correia and Luís Pinheiro, both former road bicycle racers, founded the Bike Clube de Portugal in 2014 on the initiative to develop young riders. The club, with backing from insurance company Liberty Seguros and vehicle glass repair company Carglass, started racing the following year in the Under-23 rankings.

In 2018 the team gained UCI Continental status.

Team roster

Major wins

2015
 Portuguese National Track Scratch race, Luís Gomes
 Portuguese National Track Points race, Luís Gomes
 Portuguese National Track Omnium, Rui Oliveira
Stage 4 Volta a Portugal do Futuro, Luís Gomes
2016
 Portuguese U23 Time Trial, Gaspar Gonçalves
Stage 2 Volta a Portugal do Futuro, José Fernandes
2017
 Portuguese U23 Time Trial, José Fernandes
 Overall Volta a Portugal do Futuro, José Fernandes
Stage 2, José Fernandes
2020
 Portuguese U23 Time Trial, Guilherme Mota
Stage 1 Volta a Portugal, Luís Gomes

References

External links
 

UCI Continental Teams (Europe)
Cycling teams based in Portugal
Cycling teams established in 2015